Øyvind Aasland (born November 11, 1967) is a Norwegian former darts player.

Career

Aasland competed at the 1992 BDO World Darts Championship, where he was defeated by former World Champion John Lowe 3–0 in the first round. He was the second Norwegian to play in the World Professional Darts Championship, with Knud Nilsen being the first, playing in the previous year. He also played in the 1995 Winmau World Masters, losing in the first round to then reigning World Master and World Champion Richie Burnett. Aasland has been Norwegian Champion 34 times (May 2011) and is still one of the top players in Norway.

World Championship results

BDO

 1992: 1st Round (lost to John Lowe 0–3)

External links
Profile at Darts Database

Norwegian darts players
Living people
British Darts Organisation players
1967 births